Barbara Boxall (14 August 1932 – 14 March 2017) was the editor of Woman magazine from 1964 to 1975 when the publication was transitioning from covering mainly fashion, cooking, and homemaking to a wider range of issues of interest to women such as domestic violence and sex advice.

References 

1932 births
2017 deaths
English magazine editors
People from Feltham
People educated at Lady Margaret School